For the ancient individual, see Megaleas of Macedon

Megaleas is a genus of skippers in the family Hesperiidae.

References
Natural History Museum Lepidoptera genus database

Hesperiinae
Hesperiidae genera